Tomáš Tatar (born 1 December 1990) is a Slovak professional ice hockey left winger for the New Jersey Devils in the National Hockey League (NHL). Tatar was drafted 60th overall by the Detroit Red Wings in the 2009 NHL Entry Draft.

Playing career

Slovak Extraliga
During the 2007–08 season, Tatar saw time with Dukla Trenčín's U18 and U20 squads, finishing the season with a combined 50 goals and 39 assists in 46 games.

During the 2008–09 season, Tatar's first season in the senior Slovak hockey system, he played for HKm Zvolen in the elite Extraliga, recording seven goals and eight assists in 48 games.

NHL

Detroit Red Wings
Tatar was drafted 60th overall by the Detroit Red Wings in the 2009 NHL Entry Draft. He was also drafted 15th overall by SKA Saint Petersburg in the 2009 KHL Entry Draft. On 25 September 2009, Tatar signed a three-year, entry-level contract with the Red Wings. After signing with Detroit, Tatar was assigned to their American Hockey League (AHL) affiliate, the Grand Rapids Griffins.

During the 2009–10 season, his first in North America, Tatar recorded 16 goals and 16 assists in 58 games with Grand Rapids in his rookie season.

During the 2010–11 season, in his second professional season, Tatar recorded 24 goals and 33 assists in 70 games with the Griffins.

Tatar made his NHL debut on 31 December 2010, where he scored his first NHL goal against Dwayne Roloson of the New York Islanders.

During the 2011–12 season, Tatar was the leading scorer for the Griffins in his third professional season. Skating in all 76 games for the Griffins, he scored 24 goals and 34 assists, however the Griffins failed to make the Calder Cup playoffs, finishing fourth in the North Division.

During the 2012–13 season, Tatar played for three teams. Due to the 2012–13 NHL lockout, he started the season with the ŠHK 37 Piešťany in Slovakia, where he played eight games and recorded five goals and five assists. Following the lockout, Tatar played in 18 games for the Red Wings, recording four goals and three assists. He then ended the season with Grand Rapids, where he won the Calder Cup as the AHL champions. Tatar was the leading scorer for the Griffins during the playoffs, scoring 16 goals and five assists in 24 games, and was awarded the Jack A. Butterfield Trophy for Most Valuable Player in the 2013 playoffs.

During the 2013–14 season, in his first full NHL season, Tatar finished the season with 39 points, ranking second on the team in goals with 19.

On 28 July 2014, the Red Wings signed Tatar to a three-year, $8.25 million contract extension.

Tatar was named the Second Star of the Week for the week ending 24 November 2014. He tied for second in the NHL with four goals and one assist, including two game-winning goals, to lead the Red Wings to two victories in three games. He was also named the Second Star of the Week for the week ending 19 January 2015; he tied for first in the League with five goals and two assists, scoring in four straight games, to lead the Red Wings to four-straight victories.

On 21 July 2017, the Red Wings signed Tatar to a four-year, $21.2 million contract extension.

Vegas Golden Knights
On 26 February 2018, Tatar was traded to the Vegas Golden Knights in exchange for a first-round pick in 2018, a second-round pick in 2019 and a third-round pick in 2021. During the 2018 playoffs, Tatar played in eight games, tallying one goal and one assist.

Montreal Canadiens
Prior to the 2018–19 season, Tatar was traded to the Montreal Canadiens, along with prospect Nick Suzuki and a second round draft pick in 2019, in exchange for their captain Max Pacioretty.

In 2019, he is injured during training (foot).

In 2019–20, Tatar set a career high in points with 61 through 68 regular season games. Tatar typically played on Montreal's first line with Brendan Gallagher and Phillip Danault during the season.

New Jersey Devils
On 5 August 2021, as a free agent from Montreal, Tatar signed a two-year, $9 million contract with the New Jersey Devils.

International play

Tatar represented Slovakia at the 2009 World Junior Ice Hockey Championships, where he was the team's leading-scorer, and finished tied for fourth in tournament scoring, recording seven goals and four assists in seven games. Tatar again represented Slovakia at the 2010 World Junior Ice Hockey Championships, where he scored three goals and two assists in six games. That same year, he also represented the senior Slovak team at the 2010 IIHF World Championship, scoring two goals in six games.

Tatar also played for Slovakia at the 2012 IIHF World Championship, where he was the youngest player on the roster. He skated in all ten games for the silver medal-winning Slovakia at the World Championships, finishing with two goals and three assists. Slovakia finished second to Russia after defeating the Czech Republic in the semifinals.

Tatar was then selected to play for Slovakia at the 2014 Winter Olympics in Sochi, Russia, where he finished the tournament as the squad's second-leading scorer, with one goal and one assist. Tatar also represented Slovakia later that year at the 2014 IIHF World Championship, where he was the team's second-leading scorer, recording four goals and four assists in seven games.

Tatar represented Slovakia at the 2015 IIHF World Championship, where he recorded two assists in six games.

Tatar represented Team Europe at the 2016 World Cup of Hockey, where he was the team's leading goal scorer, recording three goals in six games, including an overtime goal against Sweden in the semifinal and won a silver medal.

Personal life
Tatar is a supporter of FC Bayern Munich.

Career statistics

Regular season and playoffs

International

References

External links
 
 
 
 

1990 births
Living people
Detroit Red Wings draft picks
Detroit Red Wings players
Grand Rapids Griffins players
HKM Zvolen players
Ice hockey players at the 2014 Winter Olympics
Montreal Canadiens players
New Jersey Devils players
Olympic ice hockey players of Slovakia
People from Ilava
Sportspeople from the Trenčín Region
Slovak expatriate ice hockey players in Canada
Slovak expatriate ice hockey players in the United States
Slovak ice hockey forwards
Vegas Golden Knights players